Osprey was a township community in Grey County, Ontario. In 2001 it was amalgamated with the village of Markdale and the townships of Euphrasia and Artemesia to form the Municipality of Grey Highlands.

Communities in Grey County
2001 disestablishments in Ontario
Former township municipalities in Ontario
Populated places disestablished in 2001